Boone County Courthouse is a historic courthouse located at Lebanon, Boone County, Indiana. It was built between 1909 and 1911, and is a three-story, rectangular Classical Revival building constructed of granite and Bedford limestone. It features an art glass dome surmounted by a clock tower and pedimented porticoes supported by four Ionic order columns.

It was listed on the National Register of Historic Places in 1986.

References

Clock towers in Indiana
County courthouses in Indiana
Courthouses on the National Register of Historic Places in Indiana
Neoclassical architecture in Indiana
Government buildings completed in 1911
Buildings and structures in Boone County, Indiana
National Register of Historic Places in Boone County, Indiana
1911 establishments in Indiana